Camp Victory was the primary component of the Victory Base Complex (VBC) which occupied the area surrounding the Baghdad International Airport (BIAP). The Al-Faw Palace, which served as the headquarters for the Multi-National Corps – Iraq (and later United States Forces – Iraq until it was turned over to the Government of Iraq on December 1, 2011), was located on Camp Victory. Camp Victory itself lay approximately 5 kilometers (3.1 miles) from BIAP.

Other Camps that made up the Victory Base Complex included Camp Liberty (formerly known as Camp Victory North), Camp Striker, and Camp Slayer. On December 1, 2011, Camp Victory, under an agreement with the Iraqi Government in 2008, was handed over by the United States to the Iraqis.

Living conditions
Camp Victory was named after V Corps, also called Victory Corps, from Heidelberg, Germany. They began to occupy the area in April 2003. Camp Victory had several living support areas; Freedom Village, Dodge Cities North and South, Omaha Beach, Audie Murphy LSAs, Red Leg LSA, the Brickyard along with building 51F, which is commonly known as "Area 51". There were also two smaller living areas reserved for government contractors, as well as a third for employees of an Iraqi contracting company.

Camp Victory contained the Sports Oasis dining facility (DFAC) and the Coalition Cafe. There were also several chain restaurants, located near the PX on Camp Liberty; including a Pizza Hut, a Subway, a Cinnabon, a Burger King, a Taco Bell, and a Green Beans coffee cafe.  Additionally a new bowling center were opened to the northwest of Camp Victory main and a Turkish restaurant/hookah/coffee bar near Lost Lake just east of Dodge City North.

Camp Victory had a small AAFES shoppette south of the Sports Oasis DFAC with an additional Green Beans Cafe, Pizza Hut, Barber Shop, and Turkish novelty goods stores.  Two basketball courts also occupy this area and one has been converted to a soccer court.  Separating the containerized housing units or CHUs and the eating establishments was "Tumlin Field" a popular spot for American football pickup games. The Tumlin Field sign read "Tumlin Field, cause not all the fighting is done outside the wire".

Morale, welfare, and recreation

Camp Victory was also a common stop for USO tours, including entertainers such as Charlie Daniels, Stephen Colbert, and NFL players. Camp Victory had a well-equipped gym, and was always in use by the many troops on post. There were two Morale, Welfare, and Recreation (MWR) buildings on Camp Victory, one near Building 51F and the other near Dodge City South. They provided free internet access, commercial phones, televisions, and indoor sports equipment such as table tennis and air hockey. Internet access was also available at housing on post to soldiers at a rate of $65 per month, which was provided by Jackal Wireless, a private contractor.

WWE had held their annual Tribute to the Troops at the base several times.

Cultural references
Part of the 2008 film The Hurt Locker was set at Camp Liberty.

Camp Victory was a featured "Santa Cam" location for the 2007 NORAD Tracks Santa tracking season.

It was also was featured in season 22 episode 8 of Law and Order in a story centering around a homicide due to burn pits.

References

External links
 Pike, John. "Abu Ghurayb Presidential Site." Global Security, 2002-2008.

V
Military installations established in 2003
2003 establishments in Iraq